Delatour is a French surname meaning "of the tower". Notable people with the surname include:

 Elisabeth Delatour Préval, Haitian businesswoman and economist
 Jean Delatour, French cyclist
 Leslie Delatour (1950–2001), Haitian economist

See also
 La Tour (surname)
 Latour (disambiguation)
 Tour (disambiguation)
 

French-language surnames